Der Kirschgarten (The Cherry Orchard) is an opera in four acts by the Swiss composer Rudolf Kelterborn. The German-language libretto was written by the composer and is based on Gudrun Düwel's German translation of Anton Chekhov's 1904 play The Cherry Orchard. The opera was composed between 1979 and 1981 and premiered on 4 December 1984 at the Zürich Opera House to inaugurate the newly renovated theatre. The premiere production was conducted by Ralf Weikert and directed by Nikolaus Lehnhoff. Evelyn Lear created the pivotal role of Ranevskaya.

Roles

References

Operas by Rudolf Kelterborn
German-language operas
1984 operas
Operas
Operas based on works by Anton Chekhov
Operas based on plays